Volver is a 2006 Spanish drama film written and directed by Pedro Almodóvar with actress Penélope Cruz.

Volver may also refer to:
Volver (tango)
Volver (Enrico Rava / Dino Saluzzi Quintet album)
Volver (Plácido Domingo album), 2018